Chowa is a village in the Tibet Autonomous Region of China. It lies at an altitude of 4820 metres (15,816 feet). The village has a population of about 28.

See also
List of towns and villages in Tibet

Populated places in Tibet